Claspin is a protein that in humans is encoded by the CLSPN gene.

Function 

Xenopus claspin is an essential upstream regulator of checkpoint kinase 1 and triggers a checkpoint arrest of the cell cycle in the presence of DNA templates in Xenopus egg extracts. The human gene appears to be the homolog Xenopus claspin and its function has not been determined.

Interactions
CLSPN has been shown to interact with:

 BRCA1,
 CDC45,
 CHEK1,
 POLE,
 RAD17, and
 USP7.

References

External links

Further reading